Néstor Goncálvez Martinicorena (27 April 1936 – 29 December 2016) was a Uruguayan footballer who played as a midfielder for Uruguay in the 1962 and 1966 FIFA World Cups. He mainly played for C.A. Peñarol and is considered to have been one of the best South American midfielders of the 1960s.

Born in Cabellos, Artigas, Gonçalvez began his career playing football for Salto from 1953 to 1956. In 1957, he joined Peñarol, where he played until 1970.

Personal life
Gonçalves' son, Jorge Gonçalves, was also a professional footballer. He died on 29 December 2016 at the age of 80 after being hospitalized for kidney problems.

Honours
Peñarol
Primera División (9): 1958, 1959, 1960, 1961, 1962, 1964, 1965, 1967, 1968
Copa Libertadores: 1960, 1961, 1966
Intercontinental Cup: 1961, 1966
Intercontinental Champions' Supercup: 1969

References

External links

 FIFA profile

1936 births
2016 deaths
Uruguayan footballers
Uruguay international footballers
Association football midfielders
Uruguayan Primera División players
Peñarol players
Copa Libertadores-winning players
1962 FIFA World Cup players
1966 FIFA World Cup players